Richard Franklin Simpson (March 24, 1798 – October 28, 1882) was a U.S. Representative from South Carolina.

Born in Laurens, South Carolina, Simpson graduated from South Carolina College (now the University of South Carolina) at Columbia in 1816. He studied law and was admitted to the bar in 1819. He began practice in Pendleton, South Carolina. He held several local offices. He served as major during the Second Seminole War in 1835. He volunteered with the Laurens County Company and was elected Captain of the Company. He was appointed Major of the South Carolina Regiment, and took his cavalry Battalion to Florida.

Simpson served as member of the State senate 1834-1838. He was elected as a Democrat to the Twenty-eighth, Twenty-ninth, and Thirtieth Congresses (March 4, 1843 – March 3, 1849). He declined to be a candidate for renomination in 1848. He served as member of the secession convention in 1860 and signed the ordinance of secession.

After his political involvement, Simpson engaged in agricultural pursuits. He died in Pendleton, South Carolina, October 28, 1882 and was interred in the family cemetery near that city.

Sources

External links

1798 births
1882 deaths
American militia officers
Democratic Party South Carolina state senators
Democratic Party members of the United States House of Representatives from South Carolina
19th-century American politicians
People from Laurens, South Carolina
People from Pendleton, South Carolina
University of South Carolina alumni